A by-election was held in the Dáil Éireann Dublin West constituency in Ireland on Thursday 27 October 2011, following the death of Fianna Fáil Teachta Dála (TD) and former Minister for Finance Brian Lenihan Jnr on 10 June 2011. The 2011 Irish presidential election and two constitutional referendums were held on the same day.

Patrick Nulty of the Labour Party was elected after a prolonged count.

Candidates
Thirteen candidates contested the by-election. Four were members of Fingal County Council: David McGuinness of Fianna Fáil, Eithne Loftus of Fine Gael, Patrick Nulty of the Labour Party, and Ruth Coppinger of the Socialist Party. The other party candidates were Paul Donnelly of Sinn Féin, Roderic O'Gorman of the Green Party and Peadar Ó Ceallaigh of Fís Nua.

There were six independent candidates: Gary Bermingham, a satirical actor and artist; Benny Cooney, a FÁS employee; Brendan Doris, an architect; Barry Caesar Hunt, a contestant in The Apprentice reality television show in 2010; John Frank Kidd, a retired fire officer; and Jim Tallon, a farmer.

Donnelly, McGuinness, Nulty and O'Gorman had all been unsuccessful candidates in this constituency at the general election in February 2011. Bermingham, Cooney, Ó Ceallaigh and Tallon had been candidates in other constituencies at the same election.

Result

A full recount was ordered after only 18 votes separated Socialist Party candidate Ruth Coppinger from Fianna Fáil candidate David McGuinness. After the recount, both McGuinness and Coppinger had the same number of votes in the fourth count. Under electoral law Coppinger was eliminated, for McGuinness had more first-preference votes.

It was the first time since July 1982 – when Noel Treacy won a seat in Galway East – that a candidate of a governing party won a by-election. The result left Fianna Fáil with no TDs in Dublin city and County.

See also
List of Dáil by-elections
Dáil constituencies

References

2011 Dublin West by-election
2011 in Irish politics
31st Dáil
By-elections in the Republic of Ireland
Elections in Fingal
By-elections in County Dublin
2010s in Dublin (city)
October 2011 events in Europe